Phetmorakot Teeded99 is a Muay Thai fighter.

Titles and accomplishments

Lumpinee Stadium
 2010 Lumpinee Stadium 105 lbs Champion
 2012 Lumpinee Stadium 118 lbs Champion
 2014 Lumpinee Stadium 126 lbs Champion
 2016 Lumpinee Stadium 130 lbs Champion

Channel 7 Stadium
 2013 Channel 7 Boxing Stadium 118 lbs Champion
 2016 Channel 7 Boxing Stadium 130 lbs Champion

Professional Boxing Association of Thailand (PAT) 
 2011 Thailand 108 lbs Champion
 2016 Thailand 130 lbs Champion

Omnoi Stadium
 2019 Siam Omnoi Boxing Stadium 135 lbs Champion

Fight record

|-  style="background:#fbb;"
| 2021-03-31 || Loss ||align=left| Jompichit Chuwattana || Chef Boontham, Rangsit Stadium || Rangsit, Thailand || Decision || 5 || 3:00
|-  style="background:#fbb;"
| 2020-09-26|| Loss ||align=left| Gingsanglek Tor.Laksong || Siam Omnoi Boxing Stadium ||  Thailand || TKO (Low Kicks)|| 2 ||
|-
! style=background:white colspan=9 |
|-  style="background:#fbb;"
| 2020-08-19 || Loss ||align=left| Ploywittaya SorTor.RotSurat || Rajadamnern Stadium || Bangkok, Thailand || Decision || 5 || 3:00
|-  style="background:#cfc;"
| 2020-01-28|| Win||align=left| Petchngam Kiatkampon || Rajadamnern Stadium || Bangkok, Thailand || Decision || 5 || 3:00
|-  style="background:#fbb;"
| 2019-12-25 || Loss ||align=left| Dechsakda SorJor.TongPrachin || Rajadamnern Stadium || Bangkok, Thailand || Decision || 5 || 3:00
|-  style="background:#cfc;"
| 2019-11-12 || Win ||align=left| Taladkaek Prasertratchapan || Lumpinee Stadium || Bangkok, Thailand || Decision || 5 || 3:00
|-  style="background:#fbb;"
| 2019-08-16 || Loss||align=left| Denkriangkrai Singmawin || Lumpinee Stadium || Bangkok, Thailand || KO || 2 ||
|-  style="background:#cfc;"
| 2019-05-25|| Win||align=left| Chalamsuk Nitisamui || Siam Omnoi Boxing Stadium ||  Thailand || Decision || 5 || 3:00
|-
! style=background:white colspan=9 |
|-  style="background:#cfc;"
| 2019-04-02 || Win ||align=left| Muangfahlek Por.Petchsiri || Lumpinee Stadium || Bangkok, Thailand || Decision || 5 || 3:00
|-  style="background:#fbb;"
| 2019-01-08|| Loss||align=left| Tuanpe Sor.Sommai || RuamJaiMutitaKruAriyaChat at Wat Saeng Kaeo Phothiyan || Chiang Rai, Thailand || KO || 2 ||
|- style="background:#fbb;"
| 2018-11-11 || Loss ||align=left| Taksila Chor.Hapayak|| Blue Arena || Samut Prakan, Thailand || Decision|| 5 || 3:00
|-  style="background:#fbb;"
| 2018-01-12|| Loss||align=left| Aphiwat Sor.Somnuek || ||  Thailand || KO || 1 ||
|- style="background:#fbb;"
| 2017-06-11 || Loss ||align=left| Thepbut Sitau-Aubon|| Channel 7 Boxing Stadium || Bangkok, Thailand || Decision|| 5 || 3:00
|-  style="background:#fbb;"
| 2017-04-04|| Loss||align=left| Suakim PK Saenchaimuaythaigym || Lumpinee Stadium || Bangkok, Thailand || KO || 4 || 
|- 
! style=background:white colspan=9 |
|-  style="background:#cfc;"
| 2017-03-07 || Win||align=left| Nuenglanlek Jitmuangnon || Rajadamnern Stadium || Bangkok, Thailand || KO (High Kick)||  ||
|- style="background:#cfc;"
| 2017-01-22 || Win ||align=left| Thepbut Sitau-Aubon|| Channel 7 Boxing Stadium || Bangkok, Thailand || Decision|| 5 || 3:00
|-  style="background:#cfc;"
| 2016-12-09 || Win ||align=left| Nuenglanlek Jitmuangnon || Lumpinee Stadium || Bangkok, Thailand || Decision || 5 || 3:00
|- 
! style=background:white colspan=9 |
|- style="background:#cfc;"
| 2016-10-04 || Win ||align=left| Mongkolpetch Petchyindee|| Lumpinee Stadium || Bangkok, Thailand || Decision|| 5 || 3:00
|- style="background:#cfc;"
| 2016-09-02 || Win ||align=left| Mongkolpetch Petchyindee|| Lumpinee Stadium || Bangkok, Thailand || Decision|| 5 || 3:00
|-  style="background:#cfc;"
| 2016-07-24 || Win||align=left| Nawapol Lookpachrist|| Kom Chad Luek Boxing Stadium  ||  Thailand || Decision || 5 || 3:00
|-  style="background:#fbb;"
| 2016-06-26 || Loss||align=left| Yodtongthai Sor.Sommai|| Kom Chad Luek Boxing Stadium  ||  Thailand || Decision || 5 || 3:00
|-  style="background:#cfc;"
| 2016-05-27 || Win||align=left| Phetsaifah Sor.Jor.Vichitpadriew|| Channel 7 Boxing Stadium  || Bangkok, Thailand || Decision || 5 || 3:00
|-  style="background:#fbb;"
| 2016-03-20 || Loss||align=left| Phetsuriya M.U.Den|| Rangsit Boxing Stadium  ||  Pathum Thani, Thailand || Decision || 5 || 3:00
|-  style="background:#cfc;"
| 2016-02-20 || Win||align=left| Decide Rachanont|| Lumpinee Stadium  || Bangkok, Thailand || Decision || 5 || 3:00
|-  style="background:#cfc;"
| 2015-12-13 || Win||align=left| Palaphon Sor.Tor. Hieowbangsaen|| Jitmuagnon Boxing Stadium  ||  Thailand || Decision || 5 || 3:00
|-  style="background:#fbb;"
| 2015-08-06 || Loss ||align=left| Jamsak Sakburirum || Rajadamnern Stadium || Bangkok, Thailand || KO || 3 ||
|- style="background:#fbb;"
| 2015-07-02 || Loss ||align=left| Kaonar P.K.SaenchaiMuaythaiGym  || Rajadamnern Stadium  || Bangkok, Thailand || Decision || 5 || 3:00
|-  style="background:#cfc;"
| 2015-05-30 || Win||align=left| Phetsamrong Sitphuyainirun|| Rangsit Boxing Stadium  ||  Pathum Thani, Thailand || Decision || 5 || 3:00
|-  style="background:#cfc;"
| 2015-04-25 || Win||align=left| Rungpetch Kiatjaroenchai || Channel 7 Boxing Stadium  || Bangkok, Thailand || Decision || 5 || 3:00
|-  style="background:#cfc;"
| 2015-01-09 || Win||align=left| Yuthakan Phet-Por.Tor.Or.|| Lumpinee Stadium  || Bangkok, Thailand || Decision || 5 || 3:00
|-  style="background:#cfc;"
| 2014-12-15 || Win||align=left| Phetpanlan P.K.SaenchaiMuayThaiGym|| Rajadamnern Stadium  || Bangkok, Thailand || Decision || 5 || 3:00
|-  style="background:#fbb;"
| 2014-10-27 || Loss ||align=left| Kumsub Eaglemuaythai || Rajadamnern Stadium || Bangkok, Thailand || KO || 3 ||
|-  style="background:#fbb;"
| 2014-09-11 || Loss ||align=left| Sangmanee Sor Tienpo || Rajadamnern Stadium || Bangkok, Thailand || Decision || 5 || 3:00
|-  style="background:#cfc;"
| 2014-08-13 || Win||align=left| Rungpetch Kaiyanghadao|| Rajadamnern Stadium  || Bangkok, Thailand || Decision || 5 || 3:00
|-  style="background:#cfc;"
| 2014-07-16 || Win||align=left| Jompichit Sitchefboontham|| Rajadamnern Stadium  || Bangkok, Thailand || Decision || 5 || 3:00
|-  style="background:#cfc;"
| 2014-04-28 || Win||align=left| Lomesan Sitsoraueng|| Lumpinee Stadium  || Bangkok, Thailand || Decision || 5 || 3:00
|-  style="background:#cfc;"
| 2014-04-03 || Win||align=left| Dawtrung Chor Na-Patalung|| Rajadamnern Stadium  || Bangkok, Thailand || Decision || 5 || 3:00
|-  style="background:#cfc;"
| 2014-03-13 || Win||align=left| Thewa Sitkunma|| Rajadamnern Stadium  || Bangkok, Thailand || Decision || 5 || 3:00
|-  style="background:#fbb;"
| 2012-08-18 || Loss||align=left| Saksuriya Gaiyanghadao|| Ldaprao Stadium || Thailand || Decision || 5 || 3:00
|-  style="background:#cfc;"
| 2012-06-08 || Win||align=left| Nutchai Pran26  || Lumpinee Stadium || Bangkok, Thailand || Decision || 5 || 3:00
|-
! style=background:white colspan=9 |
|-  style="background:#cfc;"
| 2012-04-20 || Win||align=left| Satarnfah Eminentair  || Lumpinee Stadium || Bangkok, Thailand || KO (Staright Left)||  ||
|-  style="background:#fbb;"
| 2012-03-18 || Loss ||align=left| Satarnfah Eminentair  || Channel 7 Boxing Stadium || Bangkok, Thailand || Decision || 5 || 3:00  
|-
! style=background:white colspan=9 |

|-  style="background:#cfc;"
| 2012-02-25 || Win||align=left| Wisanlek Seatrandiscovery || Ladprao Stadium||  Thailand || Decision || 5 || 3:00

|-  style="background:#cfc;"
| 2012-01-08 || Win||align=left| Chaylek Sor. Permsiri  || Channel 7 Boxing Stadium || Bangkok, Thailand || Decision || 5 || 3:00
|-  style="background:#cfc;"
| 2011-10-04 || Win||align=left| Wisanlek Seatrandiscovery || Lumpinee Stadium || Bangkok, Thailand || Decision || 5 || 3:00
|-  style="background:#fbb;"
| 2011-06-23 || Loss ||align=left| Kaewkla Kaewsamrit  || Rajadamnern Stadium || Bangkok, Thailand || KO (Uppercut)||  ||

|-  style="background:#fbb;"
| 2009-06-05 || Loss ||align=left| Norasing Lukbanyai || Lumpinee Stadium || Bangkok, Thailand || TKO || 1 || 
|-
! style=background:white colspan=9 |
|-  style="background:#cfc;"
| 2009-05-01 || Win||align=left| Wanheng Menayothin  || Lumpinee Stadium || Bangkok, Thailand || Decision || 5 || 3:00
|-  style="background:#fbb;"
| ? || Loss||align=left| Wangchannoi Sithubon||  || Bangkok, Thailand || Decision || 5 || 3:00
|-  style="background:#cfc;"
| ? || Win||align=left| Lookman Phonjanfchonburi||  || Bangkok, Thailand || Decision || 5 || 3:00
|-  style="background:#cfc;"
| ? || Win||align=left| Apidet Sor.Sommai||  || Bangkok, Thailand || Decision || 5 || 3:00

|-  style="background:#cfc;"
| ? || Win||align=left| Kanusilek  || Lumpinee Stadium || Bangkok, Thailand || Decision || 5 || 3:00
|-  style="background:#fbb;"
| ? || Loss||align=left| Chatchai Sor.Talaytong  || Lumpinee Stadium || Bangkok, Thailand || Decision || 5 || 3:00
|-  style="background:#fbb;"
| ? || Loss||align=left| Chatchai Sor.Talaytong  || Lumpinee Stadium || Bangkok, Thailand || Decision || 5 || 3:00
|-
| colspan=9 | Legend:

References

Phetmorakot Teeded99
Living people
1992 births
Phetmorakot Teeded99